Franciszek Masiak (3 October 1906 – 5 April 1983) was a Polish sculptor. His work was part of the art competitions at the 1932 Summer Olympics and the 1936 Summer Olympics.

References

External links
 

1906 births
1983 deaths
20th-century Polish sculptors
Polish male sculptors
20th-century male artists
Olympic competitors in art competitions
Artists from Warsaw